Anaka is a town in the Northern Region of Uganda. It is the site of the Nwoya District headquarters.

Location
Anaka is on the Acholibur–Gulu–Olwiyo Road, the main highway between Gulu and Pakwach. The coordinates of the town are 02°36'03.0"N, 31°56'52.0"E (Latitude:2.600839; Longitude:31.947775).

Points of interest
The following points of interest lie within the town limits or close to the edges of the town:
 The offices of Anaka Town Council 
 Anaka General Hospital - A 120-bed public hospital, administered by the Uganda Ministry of Health
 Anaka central market
 The Acholibur–Gulu–Olwiyo Road, the main highway between Gulu and Pakwach
 Pope Paul VI Senior Secondary School
 Anaka Catholic Church

See also
Nwoya
Karuma
Pakuba
Acholi sub-region
Acholi people

References

External links 
 Nwoya District Map

Nwoya District
Populated places in Northern Region, Uganda
Cities in the Great Rift Valley